Zhang Di is a former Chinese male volleyball player. He was part of the China men's national volleyball team. He played for Bayi (Army) Keming Surface Industry.

Clubs 
 Army (1994)

References

Further reading 
 FIVB Profile
 Volleyball: India beat Japan to reach quarters of Men’s U21 Worlds

Living people
Year of birth missing (living people)
Place of birth missing (living people)
Chinese men's volleyball players
Asian Games medalists in volleyball
Volleyball players at the 1994 Asian Games
Medalists at the 1994 Asian Games
Asian Games silver medalists for China
20th-century Chinese people